West Langwell is a small crofting settlement in Rogart, Sutherland is in the Scottish council area of Highland within the Scottish Highlands.

Gallery

References

Populated places in Sutherland